David Edelsten (13 March 1933 – 2 February 2012) was an English writer, British Army Brigadier and charity organizer.

Biography
David Edelsten was the second son of Alan & Grace Edelsten. His father, a doctor, used a horse to visit patients. In 1952, after attending Clifton College, he attended Sandhurst and joined the 13th/18th Royal Hussars. He arrived with only his horse. He served in the Malayan Emergency and as a Major was in charge of training from 1966 to 1967. He was second in command of the 3rd Infantry Brigade during The Troubles and played weekly squash.  He began writing in 1991 for twelve years with Country Life. He wrote six books and was a member of the Surtees Society.

References

People educated at Clifton College
Graduates of the Royal Military Academy Sandhurst
British Army personnel of the Malayan Emergency
13th/18th Royal Hussars officers
1933 births
2012 deaths
British Army brigadiers
Military personnel from London